The Samuel Zemurray, Jr. and Doris Zemurray Stone-Radcliffe Professor is the first endowed chair at Harvard University created specifically to be filled by a woman.

History 
In 1947, Samuel Zemurray, an American businessman, gave Harvard University $225,000 to $250,000 to establish an endowed professorship for “a distinguished woman scholar” to be selected by a University committee. Zemurray gave the money to Harvard in honor of Zemurray’s children, Samuel Zemurray, Jr. and Doris Zemurray Stone.

Samuel Zemurray, Jr., was a graduate of the Harvard Business School who was killed in World War II. Doris Zemurray Stone was a graduate of Radcliffe. This professorship was one of many endowed professorships the Zemurray Foundation provided for universities across the United States.

Rather than establishing the professorship in a specific field of academic study, Zemurray chose to honor of his daughter by designating the professorship for a female candidate of academic renown. This allowed the Samuel Zemurray, Jr. and Doris Zemurray Stone-Radcliffe Professor to work across disciplines, much like Harvard’s University Professors.

List of professors 
Helen Maud Cam, 1947–1954, professor of English constitutional history
Cora du Bois, 1954–1968, professor of anthropology
Emily Vermeule, 1970–1994, professor of archaeology
Katharine Park, 1997–present, professor of the history of science
Amanda Claybaugh, 2010–present, professor of English

References

Professorships at Harvard University
1947 establishments in Massachusetts